is a Japanese footballer currently playing as a midfielder for Tegevajaro Miyazaki.

Career statistics

Club
.

Notes

References

External links

1995 births
Living people
Association football people from Hiroshima Prefecture
Japanese footballers
Association football midfielders
Japan Football League players
J3 League players
Fagiano Okayama players
Verspah Oita players
Tegevajaro Miyazaki players